Lopeti Faifua (born 22 January 2002) is an Australian rugby union player who plays for the  in Super Rugby. His playing position is lock or flanker. He was named in the Reds squad for the 2022 Super Rugby Pacific season.

Reference list

External links
itsrugby.co.uk profile

Australian rugby union players
Living people
Rugby union locks
Rugby union flankers
Queensland Reds players
2002 births